Binham is a village and a civil parish in the English county of Norfolk. 

Binham or Bynham may also refer to:

 Binham Priory, a ruined Benedictine priory in Binham, founded in the late 11th century
 Simon Binham (fl. c. 1335–1350), English chronicler and Benedictine monk of Binham Priory
 William Binham (fl. c. 1374–1396), English theologian and Benedictine prior of Wallingford, Berkshire